Russia competed at the 1998 Winter Paralympics in Nagano, Japan. 35 competitors from Russia won 31 medals including 12 gold, 10 silver and 9 bronze and finished 5th in the medal table.

See also 
 Russia at the Paralympics
 Russia at the 1998 Winter Olympics

References 

1998
1998 in Russian sport
Nations at the 1998 Winter Paralympics